The Sitka Tribe of Alaska is the federally recognized tribal government for more than 4,000 federally recognized Native people, mostly Alaska Natives from Southeast Alaska, living in or near Sitka in the U.S. state of Alaska.

History
The tribal government was created through the passage of the Indian Reorganization Act of 1934.  It was originally called the Sitka Community Association.

References

External links
 Official website
 

Alaska Native tribes
Sitka, Alaska
Tlingit